Lubaczówka (in its upper course in Ukraine:  - Zavadivka) is a river in Ukraine and Poland, a right tributary of the San. It flows through Lubaczów. Its length is 88.2 km.

See also
 Sołotwa

References

Rivers of Lviv Oblast
Rivers of Poland
Rivers of Podkarpackie Voivodeship